Line Creek is a stream in Coweta, Fayette, Fulton, Meriwether, Spalding and Troup counties in the U.S. state of Georgia. It is a tributary to the Flint River.

Line Creek was so named for the fact the Coweta-Fayette county line is formed by its course.

References

Rivers of Georgia (U.S. state)
Rivers of Coweta County, Georgia
Rivers of Fayette County, Georgia
Rivers of Fulton County, Georgia
Rivers of Meriwether County, Georgia
Rivers of Spalding County, Georgia
Rivers of Troup County, Georgia